Dennis "Dee Tee" Thomas (February 9, 1951 – August 7, 2021) was an American alto saxophone player, flautist, and percussionist, who was a founding member of R&B/soul/funk Kool & the Gang, and one of the few members to remain with the band for over 50 years, from its foundation in 1964 until the 2020s.

Born in Orlando, Florida, like most of his founding bandmates, Thomas attended Lincoln High School in Jersey City, New Jersey. In 1964, Thomas—then only thirteen years old—co-founded Kool & the Gang (initially called "The Jazziacs") with brothers Ronald Bell and Robert "Kool" Bell, and other friends.

Thomas "was known as the quintessential cool cat in the group" due to his fashion sense and "laid-back demeanor". In addition to his musicianship, Thomas was "master of ceremonies at the band's shows" and "the group's wardrobe stylist", as well as being responsible for the group's revenues, which carried "in a paper bag in the bell of his horn". In the late 1980s, the group had discussed pursuing solo projects, with Thomas suggesting the band had considered splitting into twos or threes for various projects.

Thomas married Phynjuar Saunders, with whom he had several daughters, two of whom died before Thomas. The couple lived in Montclair, New Jersey. Thomas died in his sleep at the age of 70.

References

1951 births
2021 deaths
American funk saxophonists
African-American woodwind musicians
American soul musicians
Kool & the Gang members
Lincoln High School (New Jersey) alumni
Musicians from New Jersey
People from Jersey City, New Jersey
People from Montclair, New Jersey
People from Orlando, Florida